Mahmutağa is a village in Tarsus district of Mersin Province, Turkey. It is situated in Çukurova and on the Turkish state highway . The population of village is 502  as of 2011.

References

Villages in Tarsus District